The IZh-12 (ИЖ-12) is a Soviet double-barreled shotgun.

History 
IZh-12 was designed in early 1960s as a successor to the IZh-59 "Sputnik", in 1962 first shotguns were made. Since 1963 began its serial production.

In January 1965, the price of one standard IZh-12 was 158 roubles. The price of one custom IZh-12 shotgun (with engravings, walnut stock and walnut fore-end) was between 250 and 270 roubles.

In 1967, a detachable diopter sight was proposed for IZh-12 shotguns.

In 1974, production was discontinued. In total, 311 633 shotguns have been made and 129 000 of them were sold to foreign countries.

In 1976, a new detachable diopter sight was proposed for IZh-12 shotguns.

Design 
IZh-12 is an over and under hammerless shotgun, with one barrel above the other.

Both barrels are chromed and have chokes at the muzzle end.

It has a walnut or beech stock and fore-end.

Variants 
 IZh-15 (ИЖ-15) - over/under combination gun with a rifled 5.6×39mm barrel over a 16 gauge smoothbore barrel. It has plastic or rubber recoil pad on its shoulder stock and can be equipped with optical sight

Users 

 
  - unknown number of shotguns were sold as civilian hunting weapon

References

Sources 
 Спортивно-охотничье ружьё ИЖ-12. 1964. - 24 стр. (заказ № 2525-64)
 Двуствольное охотничье ружьё ИЖ-12 // Спортивно-охотничье оружие и патроны. Бухарест, "Внешторгиздат", 1965. стр.32-33
 Е. Стайченко. Опыт подгонки ружья // журнал «Охота и охотничье хозяйство», № 7, 1972. стр.24
 Л. Е. Михайлов, Н. Л. Изметинский. Ижевские охотничьи ружья. Ижевск, изд-во «Удмуртия», 1976. - 175 стр. : ил.
 Л. Е. Михайлов, Н. Л. Изметинский. Ижевские охотничьи ружья. 2-е изд., испр. и доп. Ижевск, изд-во «Удмуртия», 1982.
 Ижевское оружие. Том 1. Ижевские ружья / Н. Л. Изметинский, Л. Е. Михайлов. - Ижевск, издательство Удмуртского университета, 1995. - 247 стр. : ил.
 ИЖ-12 // В. Н. Трофимов. Отечественные охотничьи ружья гладкоствольные. М., ДАИРС, 2000. стр.263-265

Double-barreled shotguns of the Soviet Union
Izhevsk Mechanical Plant products